These are the results for the girls' 3m springboard event at the 2018 Summer Youth Olympics.

Results

References

 Preliminary results 
 Final results 

Diving at the 2018 Summer Youth Olympics